Monacoa  is a genus of fish in the family Opisthoproctidae found in Atlantic and Pacific Oceans. They are also known as long-nosed mirrorbellies or simply mirrorbellies, in reference to the bioluminescent organ in their intestines. The largest species, Monacoa grimaldii, can grow to  standard length.

Species
There are currently 3 recognized species in this genus:
 Monacoa grimaldii (Zugmayer, 1911) (mirrorbelly)
 Monacoa griseus J. Y. Poulsen, Sado, C. Hahn, Byrkjedal, Moku & Miya, 2016 (grey mirrorbelly)
 Monacoa niger J. Y. Poulsen, Sado, C. Hahn, Byrkjedal, Moku & Miya, 2016 (black mirrorbelly)

Until 2016, it was believed there was a single species of Monacoa, but in 2016 it was determined that there are actually 3 distinct species.  The M. griseus and M. niger are distinct from the M. grimaldii because of their differences in pigmentation.  An examination of their complete mitochondrial genomes further suggests the species are distinct.

References

Opisthoproctidae
Ray-finned fish genera
Taxa named by Gilbert Percy Whitley
Marine fish genera